Stryn Sommerski is a ski resort in the municipality of Stryn, Norway. 
The ski resort is located along the 100-year-old national tourist route, Gamle Strynefjellsveien, 45 km East of Stryn city centre. From Oslo Int'l Airport Gardermoen it’s about a 5 hours drive to the North.

The ski resort opened in 1972 and is the largest summer ski area in Northern Europe. It is based near an arm of the glacier Jostedalsbreen but the skiing area is mainly outside the glacier. The extreme amount of snow fall in winter time makes an average snow depth per June 1 of 

References

External links
 official website
 official travel guide

Ski areas and resorts in Norway
Stryn